Nagy is the most common Hungarian surname, meaning "great". 

The surname is also common among ethnic Hungarians in the northern Serbian province of Vojvodina, where it is spelled Nađ and may be transliterated in other languages as Nadj.

In Romania, the name Nagy is sometimes rendered as Naghi.

Nagyová is a Czech-language and Slovak-language feminine surname derived from the Hungarian surname Nagy according to the rules of Czech name formation.

It is transliterated into Russian and Ukrainian as Надь and rendered in English as Nad.

Given name
Notable people with the given name include:
Nagy Aguilera (born 1968), Dominican Republic boxer
Nagy Habib (born 1952), Egyptian professor, surgeon

Surname
Notable people with the surname include:

 Ádám Nagy (born 1995), Hungarian football player
 Andrea Nagy (born 1971), Hungarian basketball player
 Andrej Prean Nagy (1923–1997), Hungarian footballer
 Adrienn Nagy (born 2001), Hungarian tennis player
 Anikó Nagy (born 1970), Hungarian handball player
 Antal Nagy (disambiguation), several people
 Balazs Nagy, birth name of Michel Varga
 Bill Nagy (born 1987), former American football center and guard
 Charles Nagy (born 1967), American Major League Baseball pitcher for Cleveland Indians
 Christine Nagy, actress and American radio personality
 Dániel Nagy (disambiguation), several people
 Dávid Nagy (born 1981), Hungarian guitarist
 Dennis M. Nagy, former director of the U.S. Defense Intelligence Agency
 Ferenc Nagy (1903–1979), Hungarian politician
 Ferenc Nagy (boxer) (1916–1977), Hungarian boxer
 Feró Nagy (born 1946), Hungarian rock singer
 Fritz Nagy (1924–1989), American basketball player
 Gábor Nagy (footballer born 1981), Hungarian football player
 Gábor Nagy (footballer born 1985), Hungarian football player
 Gáspár Nagy (1949–2007), Hungarian poet and writer
 George Nagy (born 1957), Canadian swimmer
 Géza Nagy (1892–1953), Hungarian chess master
 Gregory Nagy, classicist
 Gyula Nagy (1924–1996), Hungarian football player
 György Nagy (1924–2004), Hungarian basketball player
 György Nagy (curler) (born 1965), Hungarian curler
 Ibolya Nagy (1864–1946), Hungarian actress
 Ilona Nagy (born 1951), Hungarian handball player
 Imre Nagy (1896–1958), politician, twice Prime Minister of Hungary
 Imre Nagy (pentathlete) (1933–2013), Hungarian pentathlete
 Imre Nagy (fencer) (1941–2011), Canadian fencer
 István Nagy (disambiguation), several people
 Ivan Boszormenyi-Nagy (1920–2007), therapist and writer on family relations
 János Nagy (diplomat) (born 1928), Hungarian diplomat and politician
 János Nagy (footballer) (born 1992), Hungarian footballer
 Jenene Nagy, American installation artist
 John A. Nagy, American author of espionage during the American Revolution
 József Nagy (disambiguation), several people
 Judit Földing-Nagy, Hungarian marathon runner
 Károly Nagy, Hungarian astronomer, mathematician, chemist and politician
 Kira Nagy (born 1977), Hungarian tennis player
 Ladislav Nagy (born 1979), Slovak ice hockey player
 Lajos Nagy (1326–1382), a.k.a. Louis I of Hungary
 Lajos Nagy (footballer) (born 1975), Hungarian football player
 László Moholy-Nagy (1895–1946), artist, designer and photographer, instructor at the Bauhaus 
 László Nagy (disambiguation), several people
 Marcell Deák-Nagy (born 1992), Hungarian sprinter
 Marianna Nagy (figure skater) (1929–2011), Hungarian pair skater
 Marianna Nagy (handballer) (born 1957), Hungarian Olympic handball player
 Matt Nagy (born 1978), American football player and coach
 Mike Nagy (born 1948), baseball pitcher
 Nicholas Nagy-Talavera (1929–2000), Hungarian-American dissident and professor
 Olivér Nagy (born 1989), Hungarian footballer
 Orsolya Nagy, Hungarian fencer
 Péter Nagy (disambiguation), several people
 Phyllis Nagy (born 1962), American theater and film director
 Róbert Nagy (disambiguation)
 Sándor Nagy (footballer) (born 1988), Hungarian football player
 Scott Nagy (born 1966), American college basketball coach
 Sibyl Moholy-Nagy, art historian
 Stanislaw Nagy (1921–2013), Polish cardinal of the Roman Catholic Church
 Stefan Nagy (born 1961), Swedish darts player
 Steve Nagy (baseball) (1919–2016), American baseball pitcher
 Tibor Nagy (canoeist), Hungarian sprint canoeist
 Tibor Nagy (footballer born 1991), Hungarian association football player
 Tibor P. Nagy, Hungarian-American diplomat
 Tímea Nagy (born 1970), épée fencer
 Timea Nagy (born 1978), Hungarian Canadian activist against human trafficking
 Timo Nagy (born 1983), German footballer
 Vilmos Nagy, Hungarian sprint canoer
 Vilmos Nagy de Nagybaczon (1884–1976), Hungarian general
 Vince Nagy (1886–1965), Hungarian politician
 Zoltán Nagy (disambiguation), several people
 Zsolt Nagy (disambiguation), several people
 Zsuzsanna Nagy (born 1986), Hungarian ice dancer
 Krisztina Nagy

See also
 Béla Szőkefalvi-Nagy (1913–1998), Hungarian mathematician
 Gábor Takács-Nagy (born 1956), Hungarian violinist and conductor

Hungarian-language surnames